Gioia is a station on Line 2 of the Milan Metro. The station was opened on 21 July 1971 as part of the extension from Centrale to Garibaldi FS.

The station is located between Via Melchiorre Gioia and Via Giovanni Battista Pirelli, within the territory of the municipality of Milan. It is also the focus of the Management Center of Milan.

This is an underground station, with two tracks in two separate tunnels.

References

Line 2 (Milan Metro) stations
Railway stations opened in 1971
1971 establishments in Italy
Railway stations in Italy opened in the 20th century